Mannan Shaah is an Indian film music director, singer and music composer, who predominantly works in Hindi films. He composed music for the 2018 film Namaste England, the 2017 film Commando 2: The Black Money Trail and the 2013 film Commando: A One Man Army. He also given his voice for the film Kucch Luv Jaisaa (2011).

He is known for using Indian musical instruments and recording live musical instruments for his compositions.

Early life 
He went to Shree Chandulal Nanavati Vinay Mandir and completed his bachelor's degree from St. Xavier's College, Mumbai. He learnt music from late Pandit Vinayak Vora and started his training in classical music at the age of five. He assisted music director Pritam for two years. He is a disciple of Ustad Ghulam Mustafa Khan.

Career 
In 2011, Mannan started his career as a singer with Vipul Amrutlal Shah's Kucch Luv Jaisaa and lent his voice for two songs, Thoda Sa Pyaar and Baadlon Pe Paon. In 2013, he debuted in Bollywood as music composer with Commando: A One Man Army. Later, Mannan composed music for films such as Commando 2: The Black Money Trail (2017) and Namaste England (2018). 
Shaah has composed the hit song Tere Dil Mein from Commando 2: The Black Money Trail, sung by Armaan Malik, was well received by audience.

Discography

As a playback singer

As a music composer

See also 

 List of Indian film music directors
 List of Indian composers

References

External links
  
 Tune in: Melody matters at Deccan Chronicle (Interview)
 Interview: Commando Music Director Manan Shah at FilmiBeat

1987 births
Living people
Indian film score composers
Indian male playback singers
Musicians from Mumbai
St. Xavier's College, Mumbai alumni
Indian male film score composers